Bondari is the name of several rural localities in Russia:
Bondari, Pskovsky District, Pskov Oblast, a village in Pskovsky District of Pskov Oblast
Bondari, Sebezhsky District, Pskov Oblast, a village in Sebezhsky District of Pskov Oblast
Bondari, Tambov Oblast, a selo in Bondarsky Selsoviet of Bondarsky District in Tambov Oblast